The Buckingham Historic District is a national historic district located at Arlington County, Virginia.  It contains 151 contributing buildings in a residential neighborhood in North Arlington. They were built in six phases between 1937 and 1953, and primarily consist of two- and three-story, brick garden apartment buildings in the Colonial Revival-style. There is a single three-story brick building that was built in the International style. The buildings are arranged around U-shaped courtyards. The district also includes a community center, four single family dwellings, three commercial buildings and two commercial blocks.

The Arlington County government gave legal protection to some of the Buckingham buildings (those in Villages 3–12 and in the commercial area) by designating them in 1993, 1994 and 2007 as components of the County's Buckingham Village Historic District, a local historic district. However, other historic Buckingham buildings, including those in Villages 1 and 2, have been demolished. The National Park Service listed the Buckingham Historic District on the National Register of Historic Places in 1999 and expanded the listing in 2004 and 2010.

See also
List of Arlington County Historic Districts

References

External links
 18 photos, 29 data pages, and 4 photo caption pages.  
 9 photos, 2 data pages, and 2 photo caption pages.
 19 photos, 32 data pages, and 3 photo caption pages.

Residential buildings on the National Register of Historic Places in Virginia
Colonial Revival architecture in Virginia
Arlington County Historic Districts
National Register of Historic Places in Arlington County, Virginia
Residential buildings completed in 1953
Historic American Buildings Survey in Virginia
Historic districts on the National Register of Historic Places in Virginia
Neighborhoods in Arlington County, Virginia